is a castle structure in Hioki, Kagoshima Prefecture, Japan.　Ichiuji Castle is also called Ijūin Castle.

History
Ichiuji Castle was built by the Ijuin clan and was later controlled by the Shimazu clan.
In 1536, Shimazu Takahisa moved the original base of power for the Shimazu clan from Izaku Castle. But Shimazu Takahisa moved to Uchi Castle in 1550. In 1549, Francis Xavier visited the castle to meet Shimazu Takahisa.

Current
The castle is now only ruins, with some moats and earthworks. Francis Xavier`s Statue is on site.

Access
About 20 minutes walk from Ijuin Station.

References

Castles in Kagoshima Prefecture
Former castles in Japan
Ruined castles in Japan
Shimazu clan
13th-century establishments in Japan